National Route 296 is a national highway of Japan connecting Sōsa, Chiba and Funabashi, Chiba in Japan, with a total length of 59 km (36.66 mi).

National Route 296 was first constructed on April 1, 1970

References

National highways in Japan
Roads in Chiba Prefecture